Hellinsia delospilus is a moth of the family Pterophoridae. It is found in Peru and Ecuador.

The forewings are pale brown ochreous with brown spots. The hindwings and fringes are pale ochreous grey. Adults are on wing from March to May.

References

Moths described in 1921
delospilus
Moths of South America